José Marte (born June 14, 1996) is a Dominican professional baseball pitcher for the Los Angeles Angels of Major League Baseball (MLB).

Career

San Francisco Giants
Marte signed up with the San Francisco Giants as an international free agent in July 2015. He made his professional debut with the Dominican Summer League Giants, posting a 1.89 ERA in 5 games. Marte split the 2016 season between the rookie-level AZL Giants and the Low-A Salem-Keizer Volcanoes, accumulating a 2-5 record and 5.24 ERA in 15 games (14 of them starts). The following year, Marte played for the Single-A Augusta GreenJackets, pitching to a 7-7 record and 4.70 ERA in 25 starts. In 2019, Marte played for the High-A San Jose Giants, recording a 3-9 record and 5.59 ERA with 80 strikeouts in 74.0 innings across 18 games. Marte did not play in a game in 2020 due to the cancellation of the minor league season because of the COVID-19 pandemic. In 2021, Marte began the year with the High-A Eugene Emeralds, and was promoted to the Double-A Richmond Flying Squirrels after 5 games. He logged a 3.57 ERA in 19 games for Richmond.

Los Angeles Angels
On July 30, 2021, Marte, along with Sam Selman and Ivan Armstrong, were traded to the Los Angeles Angels in exchange for Tony Watson. He was assigned to the Double-A Rocket City Trash Pandas, where he made three scoreless appearances, and also struggled to an 8.59 ERA in 7 games for the Triple-A Salt Lake Bees.

The Angels called up Marte to the major leagues for the first time on August 20, 2021. He made his MLB debut that day, tossing 2 scoreless innings against the Cleveland Indians. Marte finished his rookie year with a 9.00 ERA in 4 big league appearances.

Marte split the 2022 season between the Angels and Salt Lake. He struggled to a 7.36 ERA with 15 strikeouts across 11 appearances for the Angels, while posting an improved 5.45 ERA with 46 strikeouts and 3 saves in 34 games for the Bees.

On March 20, 2023, Marte was shut down for four weeks after being diagnosed with a stress reaction is his right elbow.

References

External links

1996 births
Living people
Major League Baseball players from the Dominican Republic
Major League Baseball pitchers
Los Angeles Angels players
Dominican Summer League Giants players
Arizona League Giants players
Salem-Keizer Volcanoes players
Augusta GreenJackets players
San Jose Giants players
Eugene Emeralds players
Richmond Flying Squirrels players
Rocket City Trash Pandas players
Salt Lake Bees players